Nick Webb (born May 6, 1986) is a soccer striker, who played professionally for the Carolina Giants of the Puerto Rico Soccer League and the Vancouver Whitecaps of the USL First Division.

Youth career 
Webb began his youth career with local Premier Division team, Whatcom FC Rangers.  During his development with the Rangers, he was selected to the Washington State Olympic Development Program from the ages 15–18 and was selected 1 year with the Region IV Olympic program pool.  He finished his youth club play with top club, Snohomish United Santos.  In College, he began his career at Division II  Western Washington University earning NWAC First Team All Conference honors as a freshman before transferring to Division I Oregon State University. At Oregon State, Nick received top honors including Second Team All-Conference as well as First Team All-Academic both his Junior and Senior years. In the summer of 2007 he aided OUSA Orange of Oregon to a United States Adult Soccer Association (USASA) Under-23 National Championship and was the league's leading scorer with 17 goals in 7 games including the game winner in the National Championship.

Professional career
Webb signed with the Vancouver Whitecaps of the USL First Division on February 27, 2008. Webb has been seen playing time as a substitute for the Whitecaps early on in the season, and has also been featured for Whitecaps' PDL team, Vancouver Whitecaps Residency. In his first game against MLS squad Los Angeles Galaxy and David Beckham he recorded the game winning assist in the Whitecaps 2–1 win over the Galaxy.

After a spell at Vancouver, Webb signed with Carolina Giants, a Puerto Rican-based First Division club. In his time with the Gigantes, Nick totalled four goals and an assist in 6sixgames.

Personal life
He is the twin brother of Mason Webb. Webb also runs his own soccer training program Webb Soccer Training in Corvallis, Oregon.

External links
 Profile on Vancouver's official site
Gigantes Personal Profile
Gigantes League Page
Men's Pac-10 Soccer Records
Personal Profile at Western Washington
PR Soccer Profile

1986 births
Living people
Sportspeople from Bellingham, Washington
American soccer players
Association football forwards
Oregon State Beavers men's soccer players
Vancouver Whitecaps (1986–2010) players
Vancouver Whitecaps Residency players
USL League Two players
USL First Division players
Expatriate footballers in Puerto Rico
Western Washington University alumni
American expatriate soccer players
Expatriate soccer players in Canada
American expatriate sportspeople in Canada
Soccer players from Washington (state)